Clytemnestra (Klytaimnḗstrā), in Greek mythology, was the wife of Agamemnon, king of Mycenae, and the twin sister of Helen of Troy. In Aeschylus' Oresteia, she murders Agamemnon – said by Euripides to be her second husband – and the Trojan princess Cassandra, whom Agamemnon had taken as a war prize following the sack of Troy; however, in Homer's Odyssey, her role in Agamemnon's death is unclear and her character is significantly more subdued.

Name
Her Greek name Klytaimnḗstra is also sometimes Latinized as Clytaemnestra. It is commonly glossed as "famed for her suitors". However, this form is a later misreading motivated by an erroneous etymological connection to the verb mnáomai ("woo, court"). The original name form is believed to have been Klytaimḗstra without the -n-. The present form of the name does not appear before the middle Byzantine period. Homeric poetry shows an awareness of both etymologies. Aeschylus, in certain wordplays on her name, appears to assume an etymological link with the verb mḗdomai ("scheme, contrive"). Thus given the derivation from κλῠτός (klutós "celebrated") and μήδομαι (mḗdomai "to plan, be cunning"), this would result in the quite descriptive "famous plotter".

Background

Clytemnestra was the daughter of Tyndareus and Leda, the King and Queen of Sparta, making her a Spartan Princess. According to the myth, Zeus appeared to Leda in the form of a swan, seducing and impregnating her. Leda produced four offspring from two eggs: Castor and Clytemnestra from one egg, and Helen and Polydeuces (Pollux) from the other. Therefore, Castor and Clytemnestra were fathered by Tyndareus, whereas Helen and Polydeuces were fathered by Zeus. Her other sisters were Philonoe, Phoebe and Timandra.

Agamemnon and his brother Menelaus were in exile at the home of Tyndareus; in due time Agamemnon married Clytemnestra and Menelaus married Helen. In a late variation, Euripides's Iphigenia at Aulis, Clytemnestra's first husband was Tantalus, King of Pisa; Agamemnon killed him and Clytemnestra's infant son, then made Clytemnestra his wife. In another version, her first husband was King of Lydia.

Mythology
After Helen was taken from Sparta to Troy, her husband, Menelaus, asked his brother Agamemnon for help. Greek forces gathered at Aulis. However, consistently weak winds prevented the fleet from sailing on the ocean. Through a subplot involving the gods and omens, the priest Calchas said the winds would be favorable if Agamemnon sacrificed his daughter Iphigenia to the goddess Artemis. Agamemnon persuaded Clytemnestra to send Iphigenia to him, telling her he was going to marry her to Achilles. When Iphigenia arrived at Aulis, she was sacrificed, the winds turned, and the troops set sail for Troy.

The Trojan War lasted ten years. During this period of Agamemnon's long absence, Clytemnestra began a love affair with Aegisthus, her husband's cousin. Whether Clytemnestra was seduced into the affair or entered into it independently differs according to the version of the myth.

Nevertheless, Clytemnestra and Aegisthus began plotting Agamemnon's demise.  Clytemnestra was enraged by Iphigenia's murder (and presumably the earlier murder of her first husband by Agamemnon, and her subsequent rape and forced marriage).  Aegisthus saw his father Thyestes betrayed by Agamemnon's father Atreus (Aegisthus was conceived specifically to take revenge on that branch of the family).

In old versions of the story, on returning from Troy, Agamemnon is murdered by Aegisthus, the lover of his wife, Clytemnestra. In some later versions Clytemnestra helps him or does the killing herself in his own home. The best-known version is that of Aeschylus: Agamemnon, having arrived at his palace with his concubine, the Trojan princess Cassandra, in tow and being greeted by his wife, entered the palace for a banquet while Cassandra remained in the chariot. Clytemnestra waited until he was in the bath, and then entangled him in a cloth net and stabbed him. Trapped in the web, Agamemnon could neither escape nor resist his murderer.

Meanwhile, Cassandra saw a vision of herself and Agamemnon being murdered. Her attempts to elicit help failed (she had been cursed by Apollo that no one would believe her prophecies). She realized she was fated to die, and resolutely walked into the palace to receive her death.

After the murders, Aegisthus replaced Agamemnon as king and ruled for seven years with Clytemnestra as his queen. In some traditions they have three children: a son Aletes, and daughters Erigone and Helen. Clytemnestra was eventually killed by Orestes, her son by Agamemnon. The infant Helen was also killed. Aletes and Erigone grow up at Mycenae, but when Aletes comes of age, Orestes returns from Sparta, kills his half-brother, and takes the throne. Orestes and Erigone are said to have had a son, Penthilus.

Appearance in later works
 Clytemnestra is one of the main characters in Aeschylus's Oresteia, and is central to the plot of all three parts. She murders Agamemnon in the first play, and is murdered herself in the second. Her death then leads to the trial of Orestes by a jury composed of Athena and 12 Athenians in the final play.
 In Mourning Becomes Electra, Eugene O'Neill's retelling of the Oresteia by Aeschylus, Clytemnestra is renamed Christine Mannon.
 In Ferdinando Baldi's The Forgotten Pistolero, a Spaghetti Western adaptation of the Oresteia, Clytemnestra is named Anna Carrasco and is portrayed by Luciana Paluzzi.
 The American modern dancer and choreographer Martha Graham created a two-hour ballet, Clytemnestra (1958), about the queen.
 The Aeschylus work was also adapted by South African composer Cromwell Everson into the first Afrikaans opera, Klutaimnestra, in 1967. In four acts, the opera premiered on November 7, 1967, in Biesenbach Hall, Worcester, Western Cape, South Africa.
 John Eaton composed an opera in one act entitled The Cry of Clytemnestra recounting the events leading up to and including Clytemnestra's murder of Agamemnon.
 In the 1977 film adaptation Iphigenia, Clytemnestra is portrayed by the Greek actress Irene Papas.
 In the 2003 miniseries Helen of Troy, Clytemnestra is played by Katie Blake.
 An asteroid 179 Klytaemnestra is named after Clytemnestra.

References

Citations

Sources 

 Servius. In Aeneida, xi.267.

External links 
 

Princesses in Greek mythology
Queens in Greek mythology
Laconian characters in Greek mythology
Greek regicides
Divine twins